William David Power (30 October 1937 – 15 September 2020) was an Australian rules footballer who played with South Melbourne in the Victorian Football League (VFL).

Notes

External links 

Australian rules footballers from Victoria (Australia)
Sydney Swans players
1937 births
2020 deaths